Choctaw Lake is a census-designated place (CDP) in Madison County, Ohio, United States. The population was 1,562 at the 2000 census.

Geography

Demographics

As of the census of 2000, there were 1,562 people, 581 households, and 493 families residing in the CDP. The population density was 1,946.0 people per square mile (753.9/km2). There were 623 housing units at an average density of 776.2/sq mi (300.7/km2). The racial makeup of the CDP was 95.65% White, 0.26% African American, 0.19% Native American, 2.75% Asian, 0.45% from other races, and 0.70% from two or more races. Hispanic or Latino of any race were 0.51% of the population.

There were 581 households, out of which 36.5% had children under the age of 18 living with them, 78.8% were married couples living together, 3.8% had a female householder with no husband present, and 15.0% were non-families. 11.2% of all households were made up of individuals, and 3.4% had someone living alone who was 65 years of age or older. The average household size was 2.69 and the average family size was 2.91.

In the CDP the population was spread out, with 25.4% under the age of 18, 4.1% from 18 to 24, 32.6% from 25 to 44, 30.7% from 45 to 64, and 7.2% who were 65 years of age or older. The median age was 39 years. For every 100 females there were 102.6 males. For every 100 females age 18 and over, there were 98.3 males.

The median income for a household in the CDP was $81,644, and the median income for a family was $86,670. Males had a median income of $47,652 versus $40,588 for females. The per capita income for the CDP was $30,624. About 4.0% of families and 6.9% of the population were below the poverty line, including 15.1% of those under age 18 and none of those age 65 or over.

References

External links
 Official website

Census-designated places in Madison County, Ohio